Glen Maury, also known as the Paxton Place and Elisha Paxton's house, is a historic home located in  Rockbridge County, Virginia, near the independent city of Buena Vista. It was built between 1829 and 1832, and is a -story, brick dwelling.  It sits on a high basement, made of native stone, and has a two-story rear ell addition.  The front facade features a somewhat crude, two-story, Doric order Classical Revival portico with paired columns.  The river side is dominated by a five-bay, two-story verandah with turned wooden posts and simple brackets.  It was added about 1900.

It was listed on the National Register of Historic Places in 1979.

References

Houses on the National Register of Historic Places in Virginia
Neoclassical architecture in Virginia
Houses completed in 1832
Houses in Rockbridge County, Virginia
National Register of Historic Places in Rockbridge County, Virginia